Brigadier General James Brailsford Erwin (July 11, 1856 − July 10, 1924) was a United States Army officer who served in the American Indian Wars, the Philippine–American War from 1899 to 1902, the Pancho Villa Expedition from 1915 to 1916 and briefly led the 6th Division towards the end of World War I in 1918.

Military career

He was born on July 11, 1856 in Savannah, Georgia to Robert Erwin and Mary Ann Gallaudet. He attended Trinity College in Hartford, Connecticut. He graduated from the United States Military Academy in 1880 with the rank of second lieutenant and was assigned to the 4th Cavalry at Fort Hayes where he served in the American Indian Wars. He married Isabel Doan of St. Louis, Missouri.

From 1897-1899 he served as the commanding officer of Fort Yellowstone and the Acting Superintendent of Yellowstone National Park. He served in the Philippine–American War from 1899 to 1902. During the 1906 San Francisco earthquake he was in charge of the relief effort. He then served in the Pancho Villa Expedition from 1915 to 1916 and led the 6th Infantry Division during World War I.

He was awarded the Army Distinguished Service Medal, the citation for which reads:

After returning to the United States, he retired from the army on July 11, 1920. He died on July 10, 1924 in Pasadena, California, a day before his 68th birthday. He was buried in Calvary Cemetery and Mausoleum in Saint Louis, Missouri.

External links

References

1856 births
1924 deaths
United States Military Academy alumni
Trinity College (Connecticut) alumni
Recipients of the Distinguished Service Medal (US Army)
Recipients of the Croix de Guerre 1914–1918 (France)
Burials at Calvary Cemetery (St. Louis)
American military personnel of the Philippine–American War
United States Army generals of World War I
United States Army generals
United States Army Cavalry Branch personnel
United States Army personnel of the Indian Wars
Military personnel from Georgia (U.S. state)
1906 San Francisco earthquake